Golson is a name and may refer to:

People

 Barry Golson, American journalist
 Benny Golson, American musician
 Everett Golson, American football player
 Greg Golson, American baseball player
 Jack Golson, British archaeologist

Other

 2466 Golson, an asteroid